Concert in the Park may refer to:

 The Concert in Central Park, 1982 live album by Simon & Garfunkel
 Concert in the Park (South Africa), 1985 benefit concert at Ellis Park Stadium for Operation Hunger
 Concert in the Park (1985 album), double live album of the 1985 benefit concert at Ellis Park Stadium 
 Paul Simon's Concert in the Park, 1991 live album by Paul Simon